The Girl Who Leapt Through Time (Japanese: 時をかける少女, Hepburn: Toki o Kakeru Shōjo) is a 1983 Japanese science fiction film directed and edited by Nobuhiko Obayashi, written by Wataru Kenmotsu, and starring idol Tomoyo Harada in her first film. It is based on the 1967 Japanese novel of the same name and was released by Toei in Japan on July 16, 1983. It has since been released internationally on DVD with English subtitles under various titles including The Little Girl Who Conquered Time, Girl of Time, The Girl Who Cut Time, among others.

It was the first film adaptation of The Girl Who Leapt Through Time, about a high-school girl who gains the ability to time-travel and repeatedly relives the same day in a time loop. The film was a major box office success in Japan, becoming the second highest-grossing Japanese film of 1983. It was followed by several later cinematic adaptations, including a 2006 anime film and a 2010 live-action film.

Cast 
The following are the film's main cast.

Tomoyo Harada as Kazuko Yoshiyama
Ryōichi Takayanagi as Kazuo Fukamachi
Toshinori Omi as Goro Horikawa
Yukari Tsuda as Mariko Kamiya
Ittoku Kishibe as Toshio Fukushima

Release 
Toki o Kakeru Shōjo was released in theaters in Japan on July 16, 1983. In 2022, Third Window Films released the film on Blu-ray as part of their limited edition Nobuhiko Obayashi's 80s Kadokawa Years set, along with School in the Crosshairs, The Island Closest to Heaven, and His Motorbike, Her Island.

Reception

Box office
Toki o Kakeru Shōjo was a major box office success in Japan.

Critical reception
In 1985, Donald Willis of Variety described the film as "more affecting than affected, informed less by cloying sentimentality and relatively honest sentiment." He commented on Tomoyo Harada, finding that she "proves herself a natural. Although she is convincing at what she does, the evidence here suggests she might have the range to do much anything else." He criticized Ryōichi Takayanagi's acting, stating that his delivery "of lines is undoubtedly the result of his brain-waves being controlled by a galaxy inhabited by monotonous no-talents."

In 2010, Marc Walkov of the Far East Film Festival gave the film a positive review, describing it as a "bittersweet story about the transitoriness of love and the importance of one’s memories in keeping the past alive." He also notes that the film anticipated plot elements of the Hollywood film Groundhog Day (1993), such as the protagonist repeatedly reliving the same day and thus being able to predict events that take place during the day.

Theme song 

The song  was the popular theme-song for the 1983 movie, inspired by the story, written by Yumi Matsutoya, and originally sung by the film's lead actress, then-rookie idol Tomoyo Harada. There are several different versions.

Harada versions
The first version was released in April 1983 as the A-side of Tomoyo Harada's third single (7A0275), with a B-side "Zutto Soba ni" also written by Yumi Matsutoya and two different cover pictures, and was included on the original soundtrack album for the film (C28A0279). A third version was recorded in 1987 for her greatest hits album From T (32DH-848), and a fourth one in 2007 for her twenty-fifth anniversary original album Music & Me (XNHL-13001/B).

Matsutoya versions
Matsutoya covered her own song in the same year on the B-side of her single  and on her album Voyager in 1983.

Other versions
The original song was adapted in a commercial for noodles with then-beginning idol Yuki Kudo parodying the 1983 movie shortly after its release. Voice actress Ai Shimizu also covered the song as the B-side of her first single Angel Fish in 2003 (KICM-1077).

Hong Kong singer Sandy Lam covered this song in Cantonese in 1985.

Notes

References

External links 
 

1983 films
Japanese science fiction films
Films about time travel
Films based on Japanese novels
Films shot in Onomichi
1980s romance films
Toei Company films
The Girl Who Leapt Through Time
1980s science fiction films
Films directed by Nobuhiko Obayashi
Time loop films
1980s Japanese films